The Past Didn't Go Anywhere is an album by American folksinger Utah Phillips and American singer-songwriter Ani DiFranco, released October 15, 1996, on DiFranco's label, Righteous Babe Records.

On the album Phillips is recorded telling stories at concerts with DiFranco setting the musical background. DiFranco provides background vocals on the first and last tracks as part of her remixing, but no songs as such.

This was followed by Fellow Workers, a second collaboration between Phillips and DiFranco, which focused on Union songs associated with the Industrial Workers of the World and contained singing as well as spoken word pieces.

Track listing
All tracks written by Utah Phillips and Ani DiFranco.
"Bridges" – 8:03
"Nevada City, California" – 6:41
"Korea" – 8:30
"Anarchy" – 6:27
"Candidacy" – 1:45
"Bum on the Rod" – 4:18
"Enormously Wealthy" – 0:43
"Mess With People" – 6:44
"Natural Resources" – 2:31
"Heroes" – 1:07
"Half a Ghost Town" – 4:22
"Holding On" – 6:13

Personnel
Ani DiFranco – guitar, bass, percussion, Hammond organ, vocals, thumb piano, producer, engineer, sampling, artwork, design, mixing, Wurlitzer
Utah Phillips – spoken word, vocals, guitar
Darcie Deaville – fiddle
Mark Hallman – engineer
Marty Lester – engineer
Chris Bellman – mastering
Blair Woods – photography

References

1996 albums
Ani DiFranco albums
Utah Phillips albums
Righteous Babe Records albums